Rion is an unincorporated community in Fairfield County, South Carolina, United States. Rion has a post office with ZIP code 29132, which opened on July 15, 1884.

References

Unincorporated communities in Fairfield County, South Carolina
Unincorporated communities in South Carolina